The 2023 Africa U-23 Cup of Nations is the fourth edition of the Africa U-23 Cup of Nations, the quadrennial international age-restricted football championship organised by the Confederation of African Football (CAF) for the men's under-23 national teams of Africa. It will be hosted by Morocco in June 2023.

Same as previous editions, the tournament served as African qualifying for the Olympic football tournament, with the top three teams of the tournament qualifying for the 2024 Summer Olympic men's football tournament in Paris while the fourth place team will play the AFC–CAF playoffs to decide the final slot to the Olympics.

Egypt are the defending champions,

Qualification 

Morocco qualified automatically as hosts, while the remaining seven spots will be determined by the qualifying rounds.

Qualified teams 
The following eight teams qualified for the final tournament.

Qualified teams for Summer Olympics 
The following three teams from CAF qualified for the 2024 Summer Olympic men's football tournament.

References

External links 

 Total U-23 Africa Cup of Nations, CAFonline.com

 
Caf, Men
U-23
2023
International association football competitions hosted by Morocco
November 2023 sports events in Africa